Pat Brady is the former chairman for the Illinois Republican Party, and a former federal and state prosecutor. Brady became the chairman in 2009 when Andrew McKenna resigned to run for governor.

Prior to his selection as party chairman, Brady served on the Republican National Committee Budget Committee and chaired the RNC Ethics Committee. Brady had been active in many local and national political campaigns, most notably the McCain for president campaign, where he was a member of the Finance Committee and served as a media surrogate in the Chicago-area media market.  Brady's wife, Julie, was co-chairman of the Illinois for McCain campaign.

As chairman in the 2010 election cycle, Brady hired Rodney Davis, now a congressman in the Illinois's 13th congressional district, to manage the state party's first statewide "Victory" program.  Working closely with the Kirk for Senate campaign, the Illinois Victory Program made over 4.4 million voter contacts, helping elect Senator Mark Kirk to President Obama's former Senate seat, five new members of congress, two Illinois constitutional offices and Republican victories in numerous down ballot races in jurisdictions dominated by Democrats for decades. In addition to their electoral successes, the Illinois Republican Party raised more money for its candidates and programs than at any time in its history.

In January 2013, after a tough 2012 election cycle for Republicans, Brady, citing the conservative principles of freedom and belief in the family structure, encouraged Republican members of the Illinois General Assembly to support proposed same-sex marriage legislation.  Although he claimed to be urging support of same-sex marriage as a citizen only, and not in his official role as party chairman, the move was criticized by more conservative members of the Illinois Republican Party.

He resigned on May 7, 2013, after his embroilment in a fight over same-sex marriage with members of his party. He commented:

After his resignation as Illinois Republican Party chairman, Brady formed Next Generation Public Strategies, a Midwestern-based government affairs and media relations firm.  The ACLU hired him to lobby Republican legislators in Illinois to pass the same-sex marriage legislation that led to his ouster as Illinois Republican Party chairman.  The law passed in November 2013 and the governor signed the legislation into law on November 20, 2013 making Illinois the 15th state to have same-sex marriage.

Brady continues his political activity as a frequent commentator on local television, radio and print media and a fundraiser for political candidates and causes.  He currently does a weekly political program on the Steve Cochran Show on WGN radio 720.

Brady was an early and active supporter of now-former Illinois Governor Bruce Rauner who defeated Democrat Pat Quinn in the 2014 Illinois governor's election, but was then unseated in the 2018 Illinois gubernatorial election by J. B. Pritzker.  Brady often served as a media surrogate during the campaign and is one of the Rauner administration's staunchest advocates in the media.

Brady's wife Julie died on April 4, 2014.

On June 1, 2013, lobbyist Jack Dorgan, a vocal critic of Brady's same-sex marriage stance, was elected as Brady's successor.  Dorgan's tenure lasted for less than a year before being succeeded by Tim Schneider in 2014.

In 2015, he was named as an Illinois state co-chair of John Kasich's presidential campaign.

References 

Illinois Republican Party chairs
Illinois Republicans
Living people
Year of birth missing (living people)